Eric Forrest (born 1970) is a Canadian heavy metal musician. Active since 1988, Forrest is best known for playing in a number of metal bands, including Voivod, E-Force, and Project Failing Flesh.

Career 
During the late 1980s and early 1990s, Forrest was a member of the bands Liquid Indian and Thunder Circus. He joined Voivod in early 1994 as bassist and vocalist, picking up the nickname "E-Force". He recorded two studio albums with Voivod, Negatron (1995) and Phobos (1997), and the live album Voivod Lives (2000), before departing in 2001 when original singer Denis Bélanger returned.

Upon his departure from Voivod, Forrest formed his own band called E-Force. In 2003 he formed the band Project: Failing Flesh in Vienna, Virginia, which released three albums up to 2012. In 2017, Forrest conducted a European tour in which he performed songs from the Negatron and Phobos albums by Voivod. The band assembled for that tour, operating under the name E-Force Performing Voivod, continued touring and played at the  Brutal Assault festival in 2018.

Discography

Voivod
Negatron (1995)
Phobos (1997)
Kronik (1998)
Voivod Lives (2000)

E-Force
 Evil Forces (2003)
 Modified Poison (2008)
 The Curse (2014)
 Demonikhol (2015)
 Mindbender (2021)

Project: Failing Flesh

A Beautiful Sickness (2004)
The Conjoined (2007)
Count Back from Ten (2010)

References

1968 births
Living people
Canadian heavy metal bass guitarists
Musicians from Toronto
Voivod (band) members